S-Series is a fleet of  sounding rockets funded by the Japan Aerospace Exploration Agency (JAXA) that have been in service since the late 1960s. Manufactured by IHI Aerospace and operated by the Institute of Space and Astronautical Science (ISAS). The nomenclature of the S-Series rockets is the number of "S"s indicates the number of stages, and the following number details the diameter of the craft in millimeters. For example, the S-310 is a single stage rocket with a diameter of 310 mm.

On January 14, 2017, the SS-520-4 rocket (modified sounding rocket) attempted to become the lightest and smallest launch vehicle to send a payload to orbit, however, the rocket failed to reach orbit. A second attempt was made on February 3, 2018. This time, the rocket reached orbit and successfully deployed TRICOM-1R (Tasuki), a 3U CubeSat. Its 2018 launch made it the smallest orbital rocket both in mass and height.

S-160 
A retired single stage Japanese sounding rocket. The S-160 had a maximum flight altitude of 80 kilometers, a launch mass of 100 kg, a diameter of 160 mm and a length of 4 meters. It was launched 13 times between 1965 and 1972.

S-210 
A retired single-stage sounding rocket developed by the Institute of Space and Aeronautical Science of the University of Tokyo, predecessor of the Institute of Space and Astronautical Science (ISAS), to study the ionosphere.  A variant S-210JA was launched from Japan's Antarctic base. The first S-210 launch took place in 1966, and was retired in 1982. The first two launches of the full sized versions in took place between 1966 and 1967: they were both failures, with the motor case burning through. After redesign of the case and improved quality control the subsequent launch in August 1969 was successful. Following further successful tests in Japan in 1970–1971, the rocket was cleared for intensive use at the Japanese Antarctic base at Syowa in 1972–1978.

The S-210, like other rockets in the series, used a solid rocket motor. The fuel grain of the motor included Hydroxyl-terminated polybutadiene (HTPB), making it better suited for the cold temperatures of the Antarctic launch site.

 Gross mass: 
 Height: 
 Diameter: 
Apogee: 

It was built to replace the smaller S-160 rocket which was a proof-of-concept design rocket.

S-310 
The S-310 is an active single-stage sounding rocket. Like its predecessor the S-210 it was developed for observations in Antarctica. The rocket is 310 mm in diameter, and can reach an altitude of 150 km. The first flight of S-310 in January 1975 was successful, and it has been launched at Kagoshima Space Center at Uchinoura, Showa Station in Antarctica and Andøya in Norway. As of January 10, 2020 the S-310 has completed 57 sub-orbital launches, with its most recent launch occurring on January 9, 2020.
 Gross mass: 700 kg (1,540 lb)
 Height: 6.80 m (22.30 ft)
 Diameter: 0.31 m (1.01 ft)
 Apogee: 190 km (110 mi)

S-520 
The S-520 was developed to replace the K-9M and K-10 type sounding rockets. It is an active single-stage sounding rocket capable of launching a 100 kg payload above 300 km and provided more than five minutes of micro-gravity flight for experiments. The first launch took place in 1980, and most recently flew on 11 August 2022 (UTC).
 Gross mass: 2,300 kg (5,000 lb)
 Unfueled mass: 400 kg (880 lb)
 Burn time: 29 s
 Height: 9.00 m (29.50 ft)
 Diameter: 0.52 m (1.70 ft)
 Apogee: 430 km (260 mi)

SS-520 
This version is a two-stage sounding rocket or three-stage orbital rocket, which uses S-520 as the first stage. Unlike the previous  S-Series rockets, the SS-520 is intended to demonstrate how small an orbital launch vehicle can be.

When used as a suborbital sounding rocket, it can launch a  payload to an altitude between 800 and 1000 km. The first two SS-520s were launched in 1998 and 2000 respectively and successfully carried their payloads on sub-orbital missions.

After further development and the addition of a third stage, the fourth and fifth instances of the SS-520 were launched on full orbital trajectories.

 Gross mass: 2,600 kg (5,700 lb)
 Height: 9.70 m (31.80 ft)
 Diameter: 0.52 m (1.70 ft)
 Apogee: 1,000 km (600 mi)

SS-520-4 
This is the fourth vehicle configuration of the SS-520. It includes a small third stage, and can put a  3U CubeSat into a  orbit with an inclination of 31°. It is a technology demonstration with no serial production planned. Its maiden launch was supposed to have taken place on 10 January 2017, however it was delayed due to inclement weather (wind speeds). It was launched January 14, 2017, but failed to reach orbit due to a loss of telemetry. If successful, it would have become the smallest and lightest vehicle to ever put an object in orbit; surpassing the Japanese Lambda-4S. Telemetry was lost 20 seconds into flight. 3 minutes into the flight, controllers sent an abort code commanding the second stage not to ignite after separation and the rocket fell into the ocean within the range safety area.

SS-520-5 

The second attempt at becoming the smallest orbital launching rocket was made on 3 February 2018. Liftoff from Uchinoura Space Center occurred at the opening of a ten-minute window at 14:03 local time (05:03 UTC), successfully deploying the TRICOM-1R CubeSat.

Specifications 
 Height – 31 feet (9.54 meters)
 Weight – 2.9 tons (2.6 metric tons)
 Diameter – 20 inches (52 centimeters)
 Payload to Low-Earth Orbit – ~9 lbs (4 kg)

Launch history (SS-520 series)

References

External links
 Sounding Rocket (IHI Aerospace)

Sounding rockets of Japan
IHI Corporation